Elimaea can refer to:

Elimiotis, a region in ancient Greece
Elimaea, a genus of bush crickets or katydids